The 1974 Brantford municipal election took place on December 2, 1974, to elect a mayor, councillors, and school trustees in Brantford, Ontario, Canada. Elections also took place in the rural and small-town communities surrounding Brantford.

Charles Bowen was elected to a second two-year term as the mayor of Brantford.

Results

Bev Lavelle, who finished third in the 1974 election, was appointed to the Brantford City Council to replace Mac Makarchuk after he was elected to the Legislative Assembly of Ontario in 1975. She resigned from council in October 1976 and was not a candidate in the 1976 municipal election.

References

1974 elections in Canada
1974
1974 in Ontario